Scotcheroos are dessert bars with chocolate, butterscotch, peanut butter, and Rice Krispies.  The recipe was originally printed on the Rice Krispies box in the mid-1960s. They are popular in the Midwestern United States, especially Iowa.

Devin Alexander asked her Facebook friends what they wanted in The Biggest Loser Dessert Cookbook. Many of the responses were scotcheroos so she published a healthier version in the book. One of the foods that Vermont and North Dakota are known for is scotcheroos. Jennifer Evans Gardner said in her book Barefoot in the Kitchen: A Pregnancy Survival Cookbook that scotcheroos are a dessert that pregnant women should look forward to. A section of the book Family Scrapbooks is all about scotcheroos.
Scotcheroos were made by Kellogg's in 1965.

See also
 List of peanut dishes

References

American desserts
Vermont culture
Chocolate desserts
Peanut butter confectionery